SMK Puchong Utama (1) (officially Sekolah Menengah Kebangsaan Puchong Utama (1)) or First Puchong Utama Secondary School (1st PUMASeS) is a government funded secondary school established in January 2001 in the town of Puchong Utama located in Puchong, Selangor, Malaysia.

History 
SMK Puchong Utama (1) started construction in 1998 and was completed in 2000. 

The school officially began its operation on 1st January 2001. A total of 31 teachers were assigned to the school. On 3rd January 2001, 451 students started their education at SMK Puchong Utama (1), they consisted of 394 Form 1 and 57 "Remove Class" students.

See also 
 Puchong
 List of schools in Selangor
 Education in Malaysia

External links 
Sekolah Menengah Kebangsaan Puchong Utama (1)

Petaling District
Schools in Selangor